Soyuz TM-21 was a crewed Soyuz spaceflight to Mir. The mission launched from Baikonur Cosmodrome, atop a Soyuz-U2 carrier rocket, at 06:11:34 UTC on March 14, 1995. The flight marked the first time thirteen humans were flying in space simultaneously, with three aboard the Soyuz, three aboard Mir and seven aboard Space Shuttle Endeavour, flying STS-67.

The spacecraft carried expedition EO-18 to the space station. This included the first American astronaut to launch on a Soyuz spacecraft and board Mir, Norman Thagard, for the American Thagard Increment aboard the station, which was the first Increment of the Shuttle-Mir program. The three crew members it launched were relieved by Space Shuttle Atlantis during STS-71, when they were replaced by expedition EO-19.  The crew returned to earth aboard Soyuz TM-21 on September 11, 1995.

Crew

Mir Principal Expedition 18 
The major objectives of the Mir 18 mission were to conduct joint U.S.-Russian medical research and weightlessness effects investigations and to reconfigure the station for the arrival of the Spektr science module and the Space Shuttle Atlantis.  The historic mission saw the addition of the first new module (Spektr) since Kritall arrived in 1990, the first American (Thagard) to be part of a Mir crew, and the first docking of a U.S. spacecraft with the Mir space station.

March 1995 - Mir 18 Arrives/Mir 17 Departs

Progress M-26 Undocks for Soyuz TM-21 to Dock 
Progress M-26 separated from the complex on March 15 and made a destructive reentry into the Earth's atmosphere to clear the Kvant docking port for the new Soyuz.  Soyuz TM-21 docked by automatic control at the Kvant docking port on the first try at 7:45 UTC on March 16.  The new arrivals were greeted by the Mir 17 crew with the traditional Russian gifts of salt and bread, and shortly thereafter were congratulated on a successful docking and transfer by Russian Space Agency (RSA) Director General Yuri Koptev and NASA Associate Administrator Wayne Littles.  The crew spent much of the day transferring equipment and supplies from Soyuz to Mir.  Norman Thagard spoke with STS-67 Commander Steve Oswald in a radio hookup, exchanging congratulations on their respective flights and discussing the symbolic importance of Thagard's venture as the first American to visit Mir.

On March 17, Russian Prime Minister Viktor Chernomyrdin stopped by the TsUP to congratulate the crew.  Later, in a televised communication with ground controllers, Thagard said he hoped his visit to Mir would be the start of long-term space cooperation between the two nations.  He and Polyakov agreed that the present joint research might be the foundation for ultimate joint flights to Mars.

During the next few days, the Mir 18 crew took their body mass measurements as a baseline for investigations throughout the mission and were briefed by the Mir 17 crew on the status of the complex and ongoing studies.  The outgoing crew stowed equipment and experiment samples in Soyuz TM-20 for their return and checked out the vehicle systems.

Mir 17 Mission Ends 
Aleksandr Viktorenko, Yelena Kondakova and Valeri Polyakov entered Soyuz TM-20 on March 21 and departed from Mir on March 22, landing safely on the same day about 50 km from Arkalyk, Kazakhstan.  Polyakov had set a new record for spaceflight duration: he had been on Mir since January 8, 1994 for 438 straight days.  This trip, added to his Mir stay in 1988, brought his total days in space to 679.  He was, however, strong enough to walk to the chairs that rescue crews provided for the cosmonauts' transport to a field hospital.  He said his fit condition was a positive indication that humans could withstand a trip to Mars.

Mir 18 Crew On Their Own 
The Mir 18 crew settled into their daily routine, collecting body fluid samples for the seven metabolic experiments to be performed during their mission.  They also took air and water samples for four hygiene, sanitation and radiation experiments which would determine the role of the Mir environment in human health, safety and efficiency.  Each crewman spent time in a Chibis suit for measurement of cardiovascular system responses to lower body negative pressure.  In the absence of gravity, blood pools in the upper torso and head, causing cardiovascular deconditioning.  The Chibis suit sealed at the waist and incrementally induced a partial vacuum, or negative pressure, which drew body fluids back to the lower extremities.  Dezhurov and Strekalov also changed out a condenser in the air conditioning system, part of a long-term maintenance program to prolong the life of the station.

April 1995 - Resupply and Maintenance

Progress M-27 Resupplies Mir 
Progress M-27 was launched from Baikonur on April 9.  It docked with the Mir base block on April 11 at 21:00 UTC under flawless control by the automatic Kurs system, although Dezhurov was ready to take over by manual control if Kurs malfunctions recurred.  This Progress module carried with it a Raduga return capsule.

Cosmonautics Day Observed on April 12 
On the 34th anniversary of Yuri Gagarin's flight in a Vostock capsule, the Mir crew had a light schedule for Cosmonautics Day, a Russian national holiday.  Activities included press conferences through the Russian and U.S. mission control centers.

Progress Unloaded 
On April 13, the crew began unloading the Progress cargo of food, water, fuel, repair materials for life support systems and equipment for medical and environmental research.  Among the biological experiments were some Japanese quail eggs.  These, the crew put into an incubator on April 14.  Progress M-27 also brought a new international experiment in the form of GFZ-1, a spherical satellite with a mass of 20 kg and a diameter of 21 cm.  The German satellite was built by the German firm Kayser-Threde. Geoforschungszentrum Potsdam would coordinate the satellite's transmission of geodetic measurements by means of laser reflection to about 25 observatories around the globe.  GFZ-1 was successfully launched by the Mir crew from the base block airlock on April 19.  Two days before, the crew had launched a container with garbage as a practice run for the operation.

Interior Station Work 
Late in April, the crew learned that extravehicular activities (EVAs) for solar array work, scheduled to start on April 28, had been postponed due to a delay in launch of the Spektr module.  One reason for the delay was that equipment to interface with Mir's manual control system was added to Spektr in case the Kurs system failed again.  The crew continued routine experiment work, defrosted the ESA freezer, replaced a humidity control fan with one from Progress M-27, installed a battery unit in the Kristall module and began removing an unused shower in the Kvant module to make room for a new set of gyrodynes to support the upcoming Atlantis docking.  They dismantled the shower and cut it into small pieces for stowage on the Progress module, then installed the gyrodynes.

May 1995 - Four EVAs

Injury Jeopardizes EVA Plans 
ITAR-TASS reported on May 5 that Strekalov had scratched his hand earlier during cleaning tasks.  The scratch became inflamed and caused some concern about Strekalov's ability to do the EVA work.  Medical specialists on the ground viewed downlink video of the hand and prescribed a medication to be administered by Thagard.  The injury healed and the EVA plans proceeded.

First Mir 18 EVA 
On May 12, Dezhurov and Strekalov began their first EVA to prepare the station for Spektr's arrival, exiting the Kvant 2 airlock at 4:20 UTC and transferring to the Kvant astrophysics module by means of the STrela boom.  There they installed electrical cable attachments and adjusted solar array actuators.  Then they moved to Kristall and practiced folding three panels of the solar array to be moved to Kvant.  Thagard supported the crew from inside Mir by relaying instructions from the ground or from reference manuals when the station was not in range of ground communications.  The spacewalk lasted 6 hours and 15 minutes.

Problems on the Second EVA 
In their second space walk, on May 17, the cosmonauts successfully folded the solar array panels, assisted by Thagard, who controlled servomotor switches from inside Kristall.  The spacewalkers disconnected the array from Kristall, attached it to the Strela boom, and moved it to Kvant.  The work took so much time that, having already almost used the oxygen available through their suits, they were forced to secure the array to Kvant with tool teathers and postpone electrical connection.  Even so, the EVA lasted 6 hours and 52 minutes.  Power supply inside the station suffered without the connection of the array, necessitating interim agumentation by Progress M-27 and Soyuz TM-21's solar arrays.

Solar Array Redeployed in Mir 18 Third EVA 
On their May 22 walk of 5 hours and 15 minutes, Dezhurov and Strekalov successfully connected the solar array to Kvant, and Thagard commanded its redeployment from inside the station.  The cosmonauts then returned to Kristall, where the retracted 13 panels of another solar array to provide clearance for rotation of Kristall during its relocation to make room for Spektr.  Approximately 60% of that array was still available as a power source.

Progress M-27 Undocks to Free -X Port 
Progress M-27 left Mir at 23:53 UTC on May 22 and made a destructive reentry into the Pacific on May 23.  Thus the -Y port was freed for use in the multiple module relocation that would be necessary for the docking and ultimate permanent placement of Spektr.

First Kristall Move and Fourth EVA 

From inside the station, Dezhurov controlled the undocking of Kristall on May 26 from the -Y port.  Then the module was moved by means of its Lyappa arm to the -X port just vacated by Progress M-27.  On May 28, in their fourth EVA of the mission, Dezhurov and Strekalov moved a docking cone (Konus), from the -Y port to the -Z port to serve as the docking receptacle for Kristall in its next move.  The space-suited cosmonauts did this work from inside the depressurized base block transfer compartment.

Second Kristall Move 
In another undocking and relocation sequence controlled rom inside the station, on May 30, Kristall was moved from the -X port to the -Z port.  Because of a temporary failure in the hydraulic connections, the docking was not successful until the third attempt.

June 1995 - Mir Expansion and Historic Docking

Spektr Docking and Fifth EVA 
Despite anxieties about the automatic docking, the Spektr module successfully docked to the -X port under control of the Kurs system on June 1.  The next day, in their fifth EVA, the cosmonauts again entered the depressurized base block to transfer compartment and moved the Konus from the -Z to the -Y port.  With the Mir crew and TsUP ground controllers in joint control of the Spektr Layappa arm, the module was moved to the -Y port on June 2.  After the redocking, the crew began checking out and activating the new module's systems and transferring new supplies of food, fueled and equipment from Spektr to other parts of the complex.  On June 5, one of Spektr's four solar arrays failed to fully unfurl because a restraint that held it in place for launch failed to release, and the crew was unable to extend it by sending pulses of power to the motor or by firing Mir's thrusters.  TsUP controllers, aided by videos transmitted to them by the crew, began plans for a sixth EVA so that the cosmonauts could release the stuck array.

Thagard Surpasses Previous American Record 
Norm Thagard held a press conference on June 6, the day he surpassed the long-held record of U.S. human spaceflight duration of 84 days set by the Skylab 4 crew from November 16, 1973, to February 8, 1974.

Kristall Relocated Again 
Before its last scheduled move of the Mir 18 mission, the cosmonauts had to install two new batteries in Kristall to boost its power supply enough to accomplish the undocking and redocking.  Then on June 10, the module was undocked from the -Z port, and again with the use of Lyappa, moved to the -X port.

Atlantis Launch on STS-71 
After 4 days of delays caused by bad weather at Kennedy Space Center, Atlantis was launched on June 27 at 19:32 UTC.  About 3 hours after launch, Atlantis Commander Robert Gibson began a series of orbital maneuvering system firings that would, through the next 2 days, take Atlantis to Mir's orbit, gradually decreasing the closing rate as well as distance.  On the second mission day, as they moved toward the station, Gibson, Charles Precourt and Bonnie Dunbar began activating the Spacelab module in preparations for life sciences investigations.  The crew extended the Orbital Docking System (ODS) docking ring to the docking position and found it in excellent working order.

Historic Docking 
On June 29 at 13:00 UTC, Gibson guided Atlantis to the docking port on the Kristall module and Harbaugh engaged the docking mechanism.  The two spacecraft met 216 nautical miles above the Lake Baikal region of Russia.  After pressurization and leak checks of the vestibule airlock, the two crews met and exchanged greetings and congratulations.  There were ten of them, a new record of the largest crew ever aboard a single complex.  The docked Mir and Atlantis totaled 220 tones, a new record for orbiting spacecraft mass.

July 1995 - Mir 18 completion 
After Atlantis left the Russian space station on July 4, the homeward-bound Mir 18 crew continued their medical and scientific investigations in the Spacelab module in Atlantis' payload bay.  They used the lower body negative pressure unit and a baroreflex neck cuff to test cardiovascular orthostatic function response to microgravity.

Mir Principal Expedition 19 
The only complete Mir mission of 1995 with an all-Russian crew, Mir 19 had many international elements.  The first Mir crew launched on a Space Shuttle Orbiter, Anatoly Solovyev and Nikolai Budarin began their work in conjunction with a visiting U.S. crew and departing Mir 18 international crew.  Two of their EVAs involved deployment and retrieval of internationals experiments.  And they ended their stay by welcoming an incoming international crew.

July 1995 - Cosmic Ballet

The "Cosmic Ballet" 

On July 4, Solovyev and Budarin donned their flight suits, entered Soyuz TM-21 and undocked from Mir to a station-keeping position from which they photographed Mir and Atlantis, still docked.  About 15 minutes later, Atlantis undocked from Mir when Gibson released the hooks that held the two craft together and allowed the docking system springs to nudge Atlantis away.  As Atlantis slowly flew around the station, Soyuz TM-21 redocked and the two craft continued to take pictures of each other and Mir.  Gibson called this set of celestial maneuvers a "cosmic ballet."  However, after the Soyuz module had to redock a few minutes sooner than planned when the Mir onboard computer which controls station attitude and solar array pointing malfunctioned.  The station complex, about 10 degrees of the correct attitude, was becoming unstable and starting to drift.  The cosmonauts had to get back quickly to regain attitude control of the station.  TsUP controllers left the station in free drift while the cosmonauts replaced attitude-control hardware in the computer.

First EVA of Mir 19 
Before their launch, Solovyev and Budarin had trained to use the new tools created for releasing the stuck Spektr solar array.  On July 14, they exited the Kvant 2 hatch and made their way to Spektr using the Strela boom.  They quickly cut the offending restraint, and all but one section of Spektr's jammed solar array deployed.  Then they were able to route the power input to the complex.  They inspected the -Z port docking mechanism and found no signs of damage or pollution, clearing the port for relocation of the Kristall module.  Before reentering the Kvant 2 hatch, they inspected one of that module's solar arrays which was not tracking the sun correctly.  Their EVA ran five hours and 34 minutes, about twenty minutes over the originally budgeted time.

Kristall Relocated Once More 
In a 90-minute session on July 17, Kristall was transferred by means of its Lyapa arm to the -Z docking port from the -X port where Progress M-28 docked later in July.

Problems During the Second Mir 19 EVA 
The primary purpose of the second space walk on July 19 was to deploy the Belgian-French MIRAS (Mir infrared spectrometer) on the far end of the Spektr module.  But minutes after the EA began, Solovyev's Orlan-DMA suit cooling system malfunctioned and the TsUP ordered him to stay attached by an umbilical to Kvant 2.  The MIRAS deployment had to be postponed, but Budarin was able to do some preparatory work alone.  he also retrieved the American cosmic ray detector, TREK, which had been on Kvant 2 surface since 1991 and switched out cassettes of sample construction materials as part of an ongoing space exposure experiment.  his time outside totaled 3 hours and 8 minutes, but the troubles were not all over: After closing the Kvant 2 EVA hatch, the cosmonauts found a 2 mm gap in the seal through which air was escaping.  They had to work with the hatch to get it tightly shut.

Progress M-28 Arrives 
Launched by a Soyuz booster from Baikonur on July 20, Progress M-28 bore 2.4 tons of food and water, fuel and oxidizer, and science equipment including about 335 kg for use during Euromir 95.  Two days later, using the Kurs system, Progress M-28 docked at the -X port of the base block.

Installation of MIRAS During Third EVA 
On July 21, the cosmonauts opened the Kvant 2 hatch again and retrieved the cooling umbilical left outside in their last EVA.  Using the Strela boom, they made their way to the Spektr module, on which they installed the 220 kg MIRAS spectrometer.  This final EVA of Mir 18 lasted 5 hours and 35 minutes.

August 1995 - Interior Work 
With their EVAs completed, the Mir 19 crew turned their attention to experiments in life sciences and astrophysics and smelting experiments in the Gallar furnace.  They unloaded the cargo brought by the Progress module and monitored the automatic refueling by Progress of the base block propellant tanks.  They also performed station maintenance and repairs, including installation in Kvant 2 of new gyrodynes brought up on Progress.  They repaired the seals on other gyrodyne cases with a lute-type sealer called "germetik".

September 1995 - Progress M-28 Undocked, Soyuz TM-22 Docked and Soyuz TM-21 Undocked

Progress M-28 Undocks 
Packed with trash and obsolete equipment, Progress M-28 left the -X port on September 4 and splashed down into the Pacific, thus clearing the way for Soyuz TM-22 to dock with the next Mir crew.

Mir 20 and Euromir 95 Crew Launched 
Soyuz TM-22 was launched from Baikonur on September 3 at 8:58 UTC.  After two days of autonomous orbital flight, on September 5, the Soyuz spacecraft docked at the -X docking port.

Mir 19 Ends 
Solovyev and Budarin ended their 75-day mission on September 11, departing the station in the Soyuz TM-21 that had brought the Mir 18 crew up on March 16.  Their Soyuz made a safe landing in Kazakhstan, 302 km northeast of Arkalyk, "far away from the aiming point."  Rescue parties, however, found the crew in excellent condition.

Mission parameters
Mass: 7150 kg
Perigee: 201 km
Apogee: 247 km
Inclination: 51.65°
Period: 88.7 minutes
First Mir docking: March 16, 1995, 07:45:26 UTC 
First Mir undocking: July 4, 1995, 10:55 UTC
Second Mir docking: July 4, 1995, 11:39 UTC
Second Mir undocking: September 11, 1995, 03:30:44 UTC

References

Crewed Soyuz missions
Spacecraft launched in 1995